Butterfly tree is a common name for several species of plants and may refer to:

 Phanera purpurea, native to India and Myanmar
 Colophospermum mopane, native to Africa
 Oroxylum indicum

See also
 Butterfly bush
 Handkerchief tree
 The Butterfly Tree, a 2017 Australian film